Sommokadidhi Sokokadidhi is a 1979 Indian Telugu-language action comedy film directed by Singeetam Srinivasa Rao. Kamal Haasan plays a double role as an honest doctor and a happy-go-lucky youth. He was paired with Jayasudha and Roja Ramani. Prabhakar Reddy, Sarathi, Pandari Bai, Kanta Rao, Ramaprabha and C. S. Rao play supporting roles. This was the first film of Singeetam Srinivasa Rao and Kamal Haasan together.

It was dubbed into Tamil language as Iru Nilavugal, and Malayalam as Jeevikkaan Padikkanam. The film was remade into Hindi as Hum Dono and in Kannada as Gadibidi Krishna.

Plot 

Sommokadidhi Sokokadidhi is the story of a well respected doctor and his look alike, who realises that his face is similar to that of the doctor. So he plots a plan to take the doctor's place when he is away from hospital and he starts to pretend that he is the doctor. One day the doctor discovers he has a look alike. He pretends that he is Shekhar. Shekhar goes to rest Ranga's house but fall in love with Ranga's cousin sister at the first sight. Ranga falls in love with Shekhar's fiancée. The climax reveals that Ranga and Shekhar are identical twins. Some goons kidnapped Shekhar for money. Both brothers are reunited and marry their lovers.

Cast 
Kamal Haasan as Ranga and Shekhar (dual role)
Jayasudha as Lily
Rojaramani as Chellam
Prabhakar Reddy
Sarathi
Pandari Bai as Parvathi
Kanta Rao
Raavi Kondala Rao
Ramaprabha
C. S. Rao

Production 
Sommokadidi Sokokadidi was the first film where Singeetam Srinivasa Rao and Kamal Haasan worked together. The dialogues were written by Jandhyala.

Soundtrack 
The soundtrack is composed by Rajan–Nagendra. The song "Tholivalapu" is based on composer's own song "Nagu Nagutha Nee" from Girikanye (1977).

Reception
Reviewing the Tamil dubbed version Iru Nilavugal for Kalki, Kousigan praised the performance of Kamal Haasan, the music, dialgues and cinematography.

References

External links 
 

1970s action comedy films
1970s Telugu-language films
1979 films
Films directed by Singeetam Srinivasa Rao
Films scored by Rajan–Nagendra
Indian action comedy films
Telugu films remade in other languages